Kapin (also Romanized as Kapìn) is a village in Bala khiaban litkoh District, in the Central District of Amol County, Mazandaran Province, Iran. At the 2006 census, its population was 350, in 70 families.

References 

Populated places in Amol County